Wadi Dhaiqah is a wadi, or dry river bed, in a canyon approximately  east of the Bait Hattat (Wadi Adei) roundabout in Muscat, Oman.

As many as 120 other wadis lead to this valley, which contains a natural park extending from Wilayat Dima W'attayyeen in the Sharqiyah region to the Wilayat of Qurayyat in the Governorate of Muscat. Wadi Dhaiqah contains the fruit farms of Al Mazarea, and has been the focus of Omani government plans for a major irrigation project. The water is stored with a dam called Wadi Dhaiqah dam which is located along the Qurayyat - Sur highways road.

References 

Rivers of Oman
Dhaiqah